The Rossano Gospels, designated by 042 or Σ (in the Gregory-Aland numbering), ε 18 (Soden), held at the cathedral of Rossano in Italy, is a 6th-century illuminated manuscript Gospel Book written following the reconquest of the Italian peninsula by the Byzantine Empire. Also known as  Codex purpureus Rossanensis due to the reddish-purple (purpureus in Latin) appearance of its pages, the codex is one of the oldest surviving illuminated manuscripts of the New Testament. The manuscript is famous for its prefatory cycle of miniatures of subjects from the Life of Christ, arranged in two tiers on the page, sometimes with small Old Testament prophet portraits below, prefiguring and pointing up to events described in the New Testament scene above.

History 
The manuscript is dated by the INTF to the 6th century.

The codex was discovered in 1879 in the sacristy of Rossano Cathedral by Oskar von Gebhardt and Adolf Harnack.

On 9 October 2015 in Abu Dhabi, the international UNESCO Committee, inscribed the Codex Purpureus Rossanensis in its register of the memory of the world.

Origin 
Discovered in 1846 in Rossano Cathedral, the Rossano Gospels is the oldest extant illuminated manuscript of the New Testament Gospels. The exact time and place of its creation are still uncertain.

The manuscript is dated by the INTF to the sixth century.  The Gospels were written after the Ostrogoths of the Byzantine Empire recaptured the Italian peninsula after the war (from 535 to 553).

Rediscovery 
The codex was discovered in 1879 in the sacristy of Rossano Cathedral by Oskar von Gebhardt and Adolf Harnack.

On October 9, 2015, in Abu Dhabi, the international UNESCO Committee inscribed the Codex Purpureus Rossanensis in its register of the memory of the world.

The Rossano Gospels presents its text in a liturgical order like some other restored manuscripts. Chapters in this manuscript are arranged according to the church year. In this particular case, the readings followed the Lenten seasonal order, telling the story of Jesus' last few weeks on earth and about his death.

Although it is no longer used in Christian ceremonies, this particular Gospels are important for dissecting art and symbolism, and researching the pages sheds light on early Christian beliefs.

Description

Contents 
Presenting nearly all of its miniatures in an architecture-like setting, the Rossano Gospels is one of the few illuminated manuscripts that perfectly fits with its definitions. It helps the reader take a spiritual insight into history, politics, religion, and people, and using bright colors on purple vellum with gold and silver lettering, and brightly-painted illustrations.

In the sixth century, gospel books had two main types of presentation, Biblical order and liturgical order. Liturgical order means that the readings were arranged according to the church calendar, which begins at Advent and ends with Pentecost. The illustrations of the Rossano Gospels are separate from the text of the Gospels and are arranged according to the liturgical calendar during the season of Lent.

The now incomplete codex contains the text of the Gospels of Matthew and the majority of the Gospels of Mark with only one lacuna, Mark 16:14-20. It is thought that there was a companion second volume, which is apparently lost.

The text of the Codex agrees generally with the Byzantine text-type in close relationship to the Codex Petropolitanus Purpureus. The Rossano Gospels, along with the manuscripts N, O, and Φ, belong to the group of the Purple Uncials (or purple codices). Aland placed all four manuscripts of the group (the Purple Uncials) in Category V.

In Matthew 1:11 it has the additional reading τον Ιωακιμ, Ιωακιμ δε εγεννησεν (Joakim, Joakim begot) — M U Θ f1 33 258 478 661 954 1216 1230 1354 1604 Lectionary 54 syrh geo.

In Matthew 23:25 it reads ακαθαρσιας for ακρασιας, a reading supported by Old Latin, the Syriac Sinaiticus manuscript, and Coptic version.

Materials 
The Rossano Gospels is one of the oldest illuminated manuscript to be penned in silver ink on purple dyed parchment with colors hues chosen from dark purple to reddish brown. The Vienna Genesis and the Sinope Gospels are also written in silver ink on purple-dyed parchment. In the Middle Ages, purple was believed to be a symbol of royalty or holiness, and because Christianity considered Jesus Christ to be the embodiment of God, he is worthy of the rare purple dye.

Rossano Gospel's paper are vellum parchment, made from the skin of a calf; the thinner parchment is, the higher its value.

The large ( by ) book has text written in a  square block with two columns of twenty lines each. The prefatory cycle of illustrations is also on purple dyed parchment.

Rossano Codex is fully gilded on valuable vellum surface which makes the value of the manuscript unique and precious. In Medieval times, writing mixed with gold or silver had spiritual connotations, reflecting the presence of God.

Decoration 
In the Christ before Pilate illumination, the trial of Christ before Pilate is shown, where Pontius Pilate is sitting on a chair surrounded by people. There is a halo-like shape drawn over the whole scene, and the people are arranged in a semi-circle. Below that, separated by a ground line, are Jesus and several other figures that are supposed to be standing in front of Pilate. If someone were to draw a line around the whole image, it would form the shape of an arch. A model of an apse shows how easily the miniature could fit into the shape, and how likely it was that it is a direct copy of the apse of some structure. In many of the images, the eyes of the crowd figures are not quite focused on the subject on the drawing, suggesting that they held another position when they were first drawn. Christ stands in a subordinate position, lower and to one side. Pilate's commanding position distinguishes these miniature from almost all other versions of the trial in early Christian and medieval art. Another distinctive mark of these miniatures is the moment selected for the representation. In the first scene, this is the beginning of the trial when Christ is led to Pilate by the high priests, one of whom supports the charges. The second scene represents the choice between Christ and Barabbas offered by Pilate to the Jews. These two scenes show that the formal opening of the trial and the central moment of it when the critical issue was posed. Almost all other representations are content to present the famous hand-washing scene, the last act of the trial, in which Pilate disclaimed responsibility for the decision taken. In the Rossano Gospel's Trial of Christ, there are three acts and three interludes. The inscription on the rector at the top (Matt 27:2) announced the opening of trial in which Christ's silence and refusal to answer charges is the focal point, interpolated with the fate of Judas (27:3-5). The second event of the trial, the choice between Christ and Barabbas (Luke 23:18 or Matt 27:21), has an interluding scene featuring Herod (Luke 23:6-12). The third act of trial is the Washing of Pilate's Hands (Matt 27:23-25) with the interlude of the Message of Pilate's Wife (Matt.27:19).

In the illustration of Saint Mark writing the Gospels, there are two figures; Saint Mark is seated in a throne-like chair with his muse, Mary, as Divine wisdom. There is definitely a sense of space within.  The robes of the two figures are also lined with complexity with many strokes of the pen showing the folds of cloth. Thus, it is surprising that the surrounding architecture, which consists of two columns and what appears to be an apse or other such archway, is devoid of all but the simplest details. Even the top of the arch with its seashell-like pattern is rigid and sharp, which further proves the theory that the miniatures on the pages of this Gospels were derived from existing structures. 

Other significant images include Jesus giving the last supper to his disciples and of Jesus washing Peter's feet. Jesus and the disciple on the right end of the table are reclining; they are twisted in a way that is not proportional according to the strange dual perspective. The floor actually seems to be part of the table at first glance, as there is no distinction between where the table ends and the floor begins. The floor, too, is miraculously upended, and upon it are drawings of pheasants or peacocks. The disciples that gather around the semi-circular table form an arch. Perhaps an original of this piece was once situated in such a way. Eyes of the disciples are slightly unfocused as they look at Jesus, suggesting that their forms may have been situated along the structure of an apse's shell-like shape.

See also 
 Early Christian art and architecture
 List of New Testament uncials
Christ before Pilate
Evangelist Mark

Gallery

References

Further reading 
 A. I. T. Jonker, Studien, Groningen 1880, Bd. 6, S. 405–412.
 Zucker, Göttingische gelehrte Anzeigen, Göttingen 1881, Heft 30.
 S. Lamprecht, Jahrbuch des Vereins von Alterhumsfreunden im Rheinland, Bonn 1880, Heft  69, S. 90–98.
 S. A. Usow, Die Miniaturen zu. dem in Rossano entdeckten  Evangeliencodex aus dem 6. Jahrh, Moskau 1881.
 Oscar von Gebhardt, Die Evangelien des Matthaeus und des Marcus aus dem Codex purpureus Rossanensis.  Leipzig: Hinrichs, 1883.
 William Sanday, The Text of the Codex Rossanensis (Σ) Studia  biblica, [vol. 1] Oxford 1885, S. 103–112.
 Walther, Ingo F. and Norbert Wolf. Codices Illustres: The world's most famous illuminated manuscripts, 400 to 1600, Köln: Taschen, 2005, pp. 62–63.
 Weitzmann, Kurt, ed., Age of spirituality : late antique and early Christian art, third to seventh century, no. 443, 1979, Metropolitan Museum of Art, New York, ; full text available online from The Metropolitan Museum of Art Libraries.
 Kurt Weitzmann. Late Antique and Early Christian Book Illumination, New York: George Braziller, 1977.
 Loerke, William C. "The Miniatures of the Trial in the Rossano Gospels." Art Bulletin 43 (1961): 171–195.
Whitley, Kathleen. The Gilded Page. New Castle, Oak Knoll Press: 2000.
Loerke, W. "The Monumental Miniature." The Place of Book Illumination in Byzantine, Art. Princeton, Princeton University Press: 1975.
Weitzmann, Kurt. Studies in Classical and Byzantine Manuscript Illuminations. Chicago, University of Chicago Press, 1971.

External links 

 Ausführliche Beschreibung auf www.silagreca.de 
 Abbildungen auf der Seite des erzbischöflichen Museums in Rossano 
 Online presentation with superb reproductions 
 Images
 Evangeliorum codex Graecus purpureus Rossanensis LDAB

Byzantine illuminated manuscripts
Gospel Books
Purple parchment
Rossanensis
6th-century biblical manuscripts
6th-century illuminated manuscripts
Memory of the World Register
Rossano